China National Highway 326 (G326) runs southwest from Xiushui, Chongqing towards Guizhou Province, and ends in Hekou, Yunnan Province, which borders the northern Vietnamese town of Lào Cai. It is 1,562 kilometres in length.

Route and distance

See also 

 China National Highways

Transport in Chongqing
Transport in Guizhou
Transport in Yunnan
326